Moanda railway station is a station on the Trans-Gabon Railway and the penultimate stop before Franceville railway station, the southern terminus of the railway.  Like many stations of the Trans-Gabon, it lies outside the limits of Moanda itself, in an isolated plain.  Moanda Railway Station lies 50 km to Franceville Railway Station and 661 km to Owendo (PK 0), near Libreville.

See also 
 Railway stations in Gabon

Trivia 
The Bangombe Plateau lies southwest to the station.

References 
 Minko Monique. 1983. Les communications Terrestres. in Geographie et Cartographie du Gabon, Atlas Illustré led by The Ministère de l'Education Nationale de la Republique Gabonaise. Pg 86–87. Paris, France: Edicef

Railway stations in Gabon